The renal lobe is a portion of a kidney consisting of a renal pyramid and the renal cortex above it. In humans, on average there are 7 to 18 renal lobes.

It is visible without a microscope, though it is easier to see in humans than in other animals.

It is composed of many renal lobules, which are not visible without a microscope.

See also
 Renal capsule
 Renal medulla

References

External links
 

Kidney anatomy